Nájera is a comarca in La Rioja province in Spain.

References 

Comarcas of La Rioja (Spain)